Yulia Putintseva was the defending champion, but chose not to participate.

Kateryna Kozlova won the title defeating Tara Moore in the final 6–3, 6–3.

Seeds

Draw

Finals

Top half

Bottom half

References
 Main Draw
 Qualifying Draw

Tatarstan Open - Singles
Tatarstan Open
2012 in Russian tennis